Rev. Charles Hunter Brown (aka Rev. Charles H. Brown and Rev. C.H. Brown)
(Feb. 2, 1907 - Jan. 17, 1996), an American building contractor, religious and community leader, did much to provide affordable housing, employment and on-the-job training, social and  spiritual relief for many in Charlottesville and  Albemarle County, Virginia during the 1940s through the early 1980s.

Early years

Reverend Charles Hunter Brown, born February 2, 1907, to Lacy and Martha Franklin Brown in the Proffit Historic District, Virginia  was one of several sons born to the Browns. He often missed school to help out at home during the growing and harvesting season. As a young man, he sought employment away from the grueling life he had known as a farmer. His early employment included work with a company that laid Macadam roads. Rev. Brown’s call to the Ministry came in his late twenties. He fellowshipped with various Pentecostal churches even after he met and married Angie Loving. He later worked at odd jobs including the now defunct Arthur’s Grill in downtown Charlottesville, Virginia. It was then that the early seeds of entrepreneurship started to grow. In the meantime, he met Dr. John L. Manahan  who owned Fairview Farm in Scottsville, VA located in Southern Albemarle County. Dr. Manahan hired him to be caretaker for his dairy farm. Brown, along with his wife and children moved into the manor house. There he had no problem getting into the swing of farming. Milking cows and transporting the milk to the Monticello Dairy in Charlottesville provided an occasional break from the farm. Maintenance work around the farm allowed him to practice what would become his profession.

Master Builder

Farming was what Brown did to earn the money he needed to move his family back to Charlottesville and pursue his dream of becoming a builder. He had frequently purchased tools and Audel manuals that he told his wife would one day make money for him. In the summer of 1945, Brown purchased a house on 10 ½ Street, now located in the Historic 10th and Page District that he subsequently remodeled and added on a 3-room apartment. He moved his family of 3 daughters and 2 sons back to town. For a while, he worked for H. T. Ferron, a company that made cinderblock; and for R. E. Lee & Sons who would later become a major player in the construction industry in Charlottesville. Later, he hired himself out as a carpenter remodeling houses and specializing in additions. Soon he had a contract to build his first house. By the mid-1950s, Blacks who wanted to build in Charlottesville and the surrounding counties started to seek him out.

12th and Rosser

It was in the mid-1940s that Rev. Brown and a few others started to hold worship services from house to house. They most often met in a 2-story house on Henry Avenue across from Moseley’s Store. Rev. Brown and Rev. Moseley managed to secure a plat of land on the corner of 12th Street, NW and Rosser Avenue. In 1947, it was there that Rev. Brown constructed Holy Temple Church of God in Christ, his first major non-residential building. Soon after building the church, Brown met E. R. Martin. After doing a number of jobs for Martin who owned a lot of property, a deal was struck that made Brown the owner of several acres of land on 12th Street, NW. 
It was there that he built what would become the “family home.” The land had been a dumping area on a dead end street. However, the location was ideally suited for Brown and his family that had swelled to 5 daughters and 5 sons. Brown seemingly could not get away from farming. He maintained huge gardens and several pigs until the late 1950s. The vegetables from the gardens were shared with church members and neighbors alike.  Brown eventually built and sold 4 more houses on the same block. Most of the houses were constructed of cinder block with 2 front dormers for less than $10,000. In 2006, some 45–50 years later, the average market price was $190,000. In 2020, the last house built sold for $300,000.

In April 2008, The Piedmont Area Preservation Alliance  and the Charlottesville Architectural Review Board of Charlottesville, Virginia, recommended that Rev. Charles H. Brown's first non- residential structure, the Holy temple Church of God in Christ, be added to its list of important historic city buildings. In September 2008 the recommendation was accepted. In February 2021, the City of Charlottesville placed a plaque giving the honorary name of C. H. Brown Way to the area near the corner of 12th Street and Rosser Avenue.

Building Innovator

Rev. Brown became a licensed contractor in the city of Charlottesville in the mid-1950s. He built more than 50 residential and commercial structures as well as a dozen churches in Charlottesville and the surrounding counties. Because many were built for people with limited income and no means of financing such a project, Brown's challenge was to give his clients the best, as well as the most for their money. He became popular as a builder because he allowed his customers to make a small down payment and often financed the balance for them or sometimes even co-signed a note at the bank. His structure of choice was usually cinderblock. Many of his renovations or additions received a cosmetic coat of stucco. Brown’s reputation as a fair and honest man gained him the respect of both Whites and Blacks in the community. During his eulogy of Rev. Brown, Rev. Paul Coleman said "...Before there was urban renewal or redevelopment and housing, there was Rev. Brown."

Nearly all of his structures are still standing. Unlike houses that are constructed on a concrete slab today, Rev. Brown dug out the foundation; poured concrete footings and constructed the walls from the ground up. He studied drawings from books of plans that were available by mail. These books allowed him to use his natural artistic abilities to sketch out proposed house plans for his clients.  He taught himself to read and interpret architectural drawings and blueprints. One of his most notable commercial structures was the EconoLodge, formerly the Econo Travel Lodge, at the University of Virginia  which was demolished in 2013 http://insidecville.com/city/visionary-builder/ to create a green space. Having established himself in the business community as a master craftsman, Rev. Brown often did brickwork or concrete work for other contractors. As a skilled craftsman, he spent time teaching his laborers how to perform carpentry tasks and how to lay brick. One of his last major carpentry jobs was finish carpentry in the Main Post Office on Seminole trail when he was 80 years old.

Rev. Brown's Ministry

In 1960, Brown became Pastor of the church he had built some 13 years earlier. He and his sons, Ralph, an ordained Minister and Nehemiah Hunter Brown,  a musician (who became a minister in 1980); brought a community-oriented flavor to the worship experience. The elder Rev. Brown was extremely supportive of youth in and out of the church. He opened the doors of the church to Nehemiah and a contingent of University of Virginia students as well as to local high school students who wanted to start a choir. The high school students formed an Interdenominational Gospel Choir which later became the Dimensions of Gospel who later bridged the gap between UVA students and local towns people. The University of Virginia students had been denied the use of facilities on the school grounds for rehearsals, but under the leadership that they found at Holy Temple Church of God in Christ , the renowned Black Voices  of the University of Virginia were born.  Of note is the selection of the Holy Temple Church site for consideration to be added to the Register of Historical Buildings. The building was selected because of its enduring architecture and its cultural significance to the community.

During his tenure as Pastor, Brown also served as the District Superintendent over other churches in the Charlottesville and Waynesboro, Virginia, areas. Most notably, he was known as a Bible scholar and teacher. Being a mild-mannered, soft-spoken man gave him an air of aloofness that often gave way to a fathomless wisdom and generosity. He was active as a Pastor, attending State and National meetings until shortly before his death from the complications of congestive heart failure in 1996. In 1998, shortly after his death, a Virginia State House of Delegates Joint Resolution  was issued recognizing Reverend Brown's work and contributions to the community. In July 2021, Rosser Avenue was given the honorary name of "C. H. Brown Way."

References
Virginia State House of Delegates Joint Resolution 
 WCAV - Centennial Celebration in Charlottesville. Posted: 11:10 PM Feb 3, 2007. Reporter: Jummy Olabanji
https://web.archive.org/web/20081006153244/http://preservecva.wordpress.com/
https://www.youtube.com/watch?v=PXNZLTXKLtg
https://www.youtube.com/watch?v=0B5DTWCy8Ho

American religious leaders
1907 births
1996 deaths